Domagoj Kapec (10 December 1989 – 10 September 2008) was a Croatian ice hockey player who last played for KHL Zagreb. He was born in Zagreb, the capital of today's Croatia.

International career
He had already played for the Croatia national ice hockey team 3 IIHF World U20 Championship and 3 IIHF World U18 Championships.

Career
 KHL Karlovac (2003–2004)
 KHL Zagreb (2005–2006)
 KHL Medveščak Zagreb (2006–2007)
 KHL Zagreb (2007–2008)

Statistics:
KHL Karlovac    	Croatian League 	03/04
Croatia national ice hockey team 	WJC18 d2 	05 	  	5 	0 	0 	0 	-1 	0
KHL Medveščak Zagreb 	Croatian League 	05/06
KHL Medveščak Zagreb 	Slovenian League 	05/06 	  	21 	0 	2 	2 	  	33
Croatia national ice hockey team	WJC18 d2 	06 	  	5 	0 	1 	1 	0 	14
Croatia national ice hockey team 	WJC d2 	06 	  	5 	0 	0 	0 	0 	0
KHL Medveščak Zagreb 	International League 	06/07 	  	3 	0 	0 	0 	0 	0
KHL Medveščak Zagreb 	Croatian Junior League 	06/07 	  	6 	3 	2 	5 	  	10
KHL Medveščak Zagreb	Croatian League 	06/07 	  	9 	3 	3 	6 	  	6
Croatia national ice hockey team 	WJC18 d2 	07 	  	5 	0 	3 	3 	+2 	14
Croatia national ice hockey team	WJC d2 	07 	  	5 	2 	0 	2 	+3 	4
KHL Zagreb 	Panonian League 	07/08 	  	7 	1 	0 	1 	-8 	4
KHL Zagreb 	Croatian Junior League 	07/08 	  	14 	11 	4 	15 	+7 	65
KHL Medveščak Zagreb 	Croatian League 	07/08 	  	4 	1 	0 	1 	-8 	6 	  	2 	0 	1 	1 	-7 	2
Croatia national ice hockey team 	WJC d2 	08 	  	5 	0 	0 	0 	+6 	6

Death
He was severely injured in a car accident in Zagreb on 7 September 2008 and died on 10 September in hospital.

Titles
 Croatian champion 2007 with KHL Medveščak Zagreb

References

External links
 Slovenian Language slohokej.net

1989 births
2008 deaths
Croatian ice hockey defencemen
Road incident deaths in Croatia
Sportspeople from Zagreb